Vladyslav Korobkin (born 21 January 1983 in Kharkiv in the Ukrainian SSR of the Soviet Union) is a Ukrainian football striker who plays for FC Lyubotyn in the Kharkiv Oblast Football Championship.

Korobkin played for different clubs in three levels of Ukrainian Leagues. He made his first team debut in Premier League's match for Obolon Kyiv against FC Arsenal Kyiv on 18 May 2003, as was substituted in second time.

References

External links 
 
 Profile at Official FC Bukovyna Site (Ukr)
 

1983 births
Living people
Footballers from Kharkiv
Kharkiv State College of Physical Culture 1 alumni
Ukrainian footballers
FC Metalist-2 Kharkiv players
FC Obolon-Brovar Kyiv players
FC Obolon-2 Kyiv players
FC Podillya Khmelnytskyi players
FC Spartak Ivano-Frankivsk players
FC Sevastopol players
FC Bukovyna Chernivtsi players
FC Komunalnyk Luhansk players
FC Arsenal Kharkiv players
FC Shakhtar Sverdlovsk players
Association football forwards